Andrei or Andréi is the surname of the following people:
Alessandro Andrei (born 1959), Italian shot putter
Cristiano Andrei (born 1982), Italian discus thrower
Edward Andrei (born 1975), Romanian water polo player 
Frédéric Andréi (born 1959), French actor and director
Ionuţ Andrei (born 1985), Romanian bobsledder 
 Marcello Andrei (born 1922), Italian film director and screenwriter
Michael Andrei (born 1985), German volleyball player
Petre Andrei (1891–1940), Romanian sociologist, philosopher and politician
 Roxana Oana Andrei (born 1987), Romanian model and beauty pageant titleholder
Ștefan Andrei (1931–2014), Romanian communist politician
Vasile Andrei (born 1955), Romanian wrestler 
Violeta Andrei (born 1941), Romanian actress 
Yannick Andréi (1927–1987), the alias of French film director and screenwriter Jean Antione Andréi

See also
Andrey
Andrei (disambiguation)

Surnames from given names